Bias Melvin Gillis is a former Republican member of the Alaska House of Representatives from the 25th district which covers neighborhoods in southeast Anchorage. He was appointed in 2019, replacing Josh Revak who was appointed to the Alaska Senate.

Gillis grew up in Texas, moved to Alaska in 1965, and worked for the Bureau of Indian Affairs. He later joined the National Guard and worked in the construction industry. He then became a hunting guide before applying for the vacate house seat.

References

External links
 Biography at Ballotpedia

1943 births
Alaska National Guard personnel
Living people
Republican Party members of the Alaska House of Representatives
People from Kilgore, Texas
Politicians from Anchorage, Alaska
21st-century American politicians